Igor Jugović (born 23 January 1989) is a Croatian football midfielder who plays for NK Opatija in the Croatian Second Football League.

Club career
Jugović left Istra 1961 after only half a year in January 2013 and moved to Celje in Slovenia after another half year-spell at Slaven Belupo. He later played three years for Icelandic top tier-side Fjölnir.

References

External links
PrvaLiga profile 

1989 births
Living people
Footballers from Zagreb
Association football midfielders
Croatian footballers
Croatia youth international footballers
NK Zagreb players
FC Irtysh Pavlodar players
NK Istra 1961 players
NK Slaven Belupo players
NK Celje players
FC Sheriff Tiraspol players
Igor Jugović
NK Hrvatski Dragovoljac players
NK Kustošija players
NK Opatija players
Croatian Football League players
First Football League (Croatia) players
Kazakhstan Premier League players
Slovenian PrvaLiga players
Moldovan Super Liga players
Úrvalsdeild karla (football) players
Second Football League (Croatia) players
Croatian expatriate footballers
Croatian expatriate sportspeople in Kazakhstan
Expatriate footballers in Kazakhstan
Croatian expatriate sportspeople in Slovenia
Expatriate footballers in Slovenia
Croatian expatriate sportspeople in Moldova
Expatriate footballers in Moldova
Croatian expatriate sportspeople in Iceland
Expatriate footballers in Iceland